Malaysia competed in the 1974 Asian Games held in Tehran, Iran from 1 to 16 September 1974. Athletes from Malaysia won overall five medal and finished 17th in a medal table.

Medal summary

Medals by sport

Medallists

Athletics

Men
Track event

Women
Track event

Badminton

Field hockey

Men's tournament
Final round

 Since both Malaysia and Japan were tied on points, a play-off game was played to decide the 3rd team.

Ranked 3rd in final standings

Football

Men's tournament
Squad

R. Arumugam
Wong Hee Kok
Hanafiah Ali
Wong Kuw Fou
P. Umaparam
Mohamed Chandran
Soh Chin Aun
Shukor Salleh
Wan Zawawi
Ali Bakar
Mohammed Bakar
Syed Ahmad
Mokhtar Dahari
Harun Jusoh
Namat Abdullah
Santokh Singh

Preliminary round; Group C

Second round; Group A

Bronze medal match

Ranked 3rd in final standings

Shooting

Men

Swimming

Men

Women

Weightlifting

Men

References

Nations at the 1974 Asian Games
1974
Asian Games